USS Thunderbolt (PC-12) is the twelfth . Thunderbolt was laid down 9 June 1994 by Bollinger Shipyards, Lockport, Louisiana, and launched 2 December 1994. She was commissioned by the United States Navy on 7 October 1995.

Operational history

In 2013,Thunderbolt shifted homeport to Naval Support Activity Bahrain, arriving pierside there on 3 July 2013.

On 25 July 2017, Thunderbolt fired warning shots at an Iranian Revolutionary Guard Corps Navy vessel. According to an unnamed U.S. defense official source, "The IRGCN boat was coming in at a high rate of speed. It did not respond to any signals, they did not respond to any bridge-to-bridge calls, they (the USS Thunderbolt) felt there was no choice except to fire the warning shots."

On 30 August 2022, Thunderbolt was involved in an incident with Iran's Islamic Revolutionary Guard Corps (IRGC) when the IRGC's ship Shahid Baziar attempted to tow away a U.S. Navy Saildrone Explorer-type unmanned surface vehicle which had been monitoring the Persian Gulf. Thunderbolt, as well as a U.S. Navy MH-60 Seahawk of Helicopter Sea Combat Squadron 26, moved to intercept the Iranian vessel and by radio identified the drone as U.S. government property. The drone was released after about four hours.

References

External links
 USS Thunderbolt Intercepted by an Iranian Patrol Boat
 FAS
 Photo gallery at navsource.org

 

Cyclone-class patrol ships
Ships built in Lockport, Louisiana
1994 ships